Der kleine Häwelmann (The little Havelman) is a German fairy tale written by Theodor Storm in 1849. In 1956, an eponymous film based on the fairy tale was released. Häwelmann is Low German and refers to a small child who demands excessive attention.

Literature 
 Theodor Storm (text); Yann Wehrling (illustration): Der kleine Häwelmann. Elatus Verlag, Kaltenkirchen 1996, .
 Theodor Storm (text); Else Wenz-Viëtor (illustration): Der kleine Häwelmann. Lappan Verlag, Oldenburg 2004, .
 Monika Osberghaus: Schau mal! 50 beste Bilderbücher. dtv, München 2006, .

External links 
Der kleine Häwelmann on Zeno.org (German)
Der kleine Häwelmann on Wikisource (German)
 

German fairy tales
1849 short stories